The Joo Koon Bus Interchange is a bus transport facility located in Joo Koon, Singapore. Along with Joo Koon MRT station and FairPrice Hub, it is part of the Joo Koon Integrated Transport Hub (ITH).

The facility is situated at the junction of Joo Koon Circle and Benoi Road, and located at the ground level of NTUC FairPrice's FairPrice Hub, next to Joo Koon MRT station. It is air conditioned and features glass walls for people to view the bus bay. The walls of the concourse is orange with a fusion of white. With three sawtooth boarding berths and eighteen parking lots, it is among the smallest bus interchanges in Singapore.

History

The interchange was first announced in 2006, together with the extension of the East West line to Joo Koon. It was meant to improve accessibility to the Tuas area as well as reduce overcrowding at the Boon Lay Bus Interchange.

To ensure smooth traffic flow around the facility, the LTA expanded the roads surrounding it to increase their capacity. The interchange began operations on 21 November 2015 and done in three phases to reduce inconvenience to commuters. It is the 8th air-conditioned bus interchange in Singapore. A further change was made on 18 June 2017 with the opening of Tuas West Extension, while the service 256 and 258 were being merged into service 258, reducing the number of services in the interchange to seven. On 8 April 2018, Service 974 was introduced between Joo Koon Bus Interchange & Bukit Panjang, increasing the number of services in the interchange back to eight.

Bus Contracting Model

Under the new bus contracting model, with the exception of Bus Service 99 is under Clementi Bus Package, the rest of the bus services are under the Jurong West Bus Package.

Currently, all bus services at the interchange are operated by the anchor operator, SBS Transit.

List of routes

References

2015 establishments in Singapore
Bus stations in Singapore